The 2016–17 FEI Show Jumping World Cup is an annual international competition among the upper level of show jumping horses and riders for the 2016–17 season. The Final will be held in Omaha, United States in the week of 27 March – 2 April 2017. The Schedule Prize Money is €680,000.

Qualifiers

Results

References 

2017
2016 in show jumping
2017 in show jumping